Everton Football Club is a professional association football club located in Liverpool. The club was formed in 1878, and was originally named as St Domingo FC. The club's first game was a 1–0 victory over Everton Church Club. In November 1879 the club was renamed to Everton FC.

In 1888, Everton were one of the twelve founding members of the English Football League. The club have played in the top-flight of English Football for a record 117 years, having missed only four top-flight seasons (1930–31, 1951–52, 1952–53, 1953–54).

Major competitions won by Everton F.C., records set by the club, associated managers and players will be included in the following list.

The player records section includes: appearances, goals scored, and clean sheets kept. Player and manager awards, transfer fees, club records (Wins, Draws, and Losses) are all included in the list, as well as several others.

Honours

Domestic
First Division:
 Titles (9): 1890–91, 1914–15, 1927–28, 1931–32, 1938–39, 1962–63, 1969–70, 1984–85, 1986–87
Second Division:
 Titles (1): 1930–31
FA Cup:
 Titles (5): 1905–06, 1932–33, 1965–66, 1983–84, 1994–95
Football League Cup:
 Runner-up (2): 1976–77, 1983–84
FA Charity Shield:
 Titles (9): 1928, 1932, 1963, 1970, 1984, 1985, 1986 (shared), 1987, 1995
Full Members Cup:
 Runner-up (2): 1989, 1991
Football League Super Cup:
 Runner-up (1): 1985–86

European
European Cup Winners' Cup:
 Winners: (1): 1984–85

Doubles
 1984–85: League and European Cup Winners' Cup

Awards
 1985 World Soccer Men's World Team of the Year
 1985 France Football European Team of the Year

Player records

Appearances

 Youngest Player (All Competitions): Thierry Small, 16 years and 176 days (vs Sheffield Wednesday, 24 January 2021)
 Youngest Player in Europe: Jake Bidwell, 16 years and 271 days (vs BATE Borisov, 17 December 2009)
 Oldest Player: Ted Sagar, 42 years and 281 days (vs Plymouth Argyle, 15 November 1952)
 Most Appearances (All Competitions): Neville Southall, 751
 Most League Appearances: Neville Southall, 578
 Most FA Cup Appearances: Neville Southall, 70
 Most League Cup Appearances: Neville Southall, 65
 Most European Appearances: Tim Howard, 28
 Most Substitute Appearances: Victor Anichebe, 95

All competitions appearances
Updated 1 March 2020

(All current players are in bold. Includes substitution appearances.)

All League appearances
Updated 1 March 2020

FA Cup appearances
As of 22 August 2006

League Cup appearancesAs of 22 August 2006

European appearances
Updated 28 September 2017

Goalscorers
 Most goals in a season – 60, Dixie Dean, (During the 1927–28 Season)
 Most goals in a single match – 6, Jack Southworth (v. West Bromwich Albion, 30 December 1893)
 Most goals in the League – 349, Dixie Dean
 Most goals in the FA Cup – 33, Dixie Dean
 Most goals in the League Cup – 19, Bob Latchford
 Most goals in European competition – 8, Romelu Lukaku
 Youngest goalscorer – James Vaughan, 16 yrs and 271 days (vs Crystal Palace, 10 April 2005) (Also a Premier League Record)
 Oldest goalscorer – Wally Fielding, 38 yrs and 305 days (vs West Bromwich Albion F.C., 27 September 1958)

Top scorers (all competitions)
As of 22 August 2006 (competitive matches only):

League top scorers
Updated 10 January 2018

FA Cup top scorers
Updated 10 January 2018

League Cup top scorers
Updated 05 August 2021

European top scorers
Updated 29 December 2017

Clean sheets
As of  December 2022

Transfer records

Highest transfer fees paid

Highest transfer fees received

Awards

Managerial Awards
Barclays Bank Manager of the Year 
1984–85:  Howard Kendall 
1986-87:  Howard Kendall 

LMA Manager of the Year
2002–03:  David Moyes 2004–05:  David Moyes 2008–09:  David Moyes

Bell's Scotch Whisky/Barclays Bank Manager of the Month Award 
October 1969:  Harry Catterick
March 1970:  Harry Catterick
October 1973:  Billy Bingham
November 1977:  Gordon Lee 
October 1978:  Gordon Lee
September 1981:  Gordon Lee
February 1984:  Howard Kendall
October 1984:  Howard Kendall
April 1985:  Howard Kendall
February 1986:  Howard Kendall
December 1986:  Howard Kendall

Premier League Manager of the Month Award
January 1998:  Howard Kendall
September 1999:  Walter Smith
November 2003:  David Moyes
September 2004:  David Moyes 
January 2006:  David Moyes 
February 2008:  David Moyes 
February 2009:  David Moyes 
January 2010:  David Moyes 
March 2010:  David Moyes 
October 2010:  David Moyes 
September 2012:  David Moyes 
March 2013:  David Moyes 

September 2020:  
Carlo Ancelotti

Player Awards

European Footballer of the Year (Ballon d'Or)
1986:  Gary Lineker (2nd)

African Footballer of the Year
1994:  Daniel Amokachi (3rd)
1995:  Daniel Amokachi (3rd)

Oceania Footballer of the Year
2004:  Tim Cahill (Winner)

Football Writers' Association Footballer of the Year 
1985:  Neville Southall
1986:  Gary Lineker

PFA Players' Player of the Year
1985:  Peter Reid
1986:  Gary Lineker

PFA Merit Award
1977:  Jack Taylor
1982:  Joe Mercer
1986:  Alan Ball (As 1966 England World Cup Squad)
1986:  Ray Wilson (As 1966 England World Cup Squad)
1994:  Billy Bingham
1997:  Peter Beardsley

Premier League Player of the Month Award
February 1995:  Duncan Ferguson
April 1996:  Andrei Kanchelskis
April 1999:  Kevin Campbell
September 2006:  Andy Johnson
February 2009:  Phil Jagielka
April 2012:  Nikica Jelavić
November 2012:  Marouane Fellaini
March 2017:  Romelu Lukaku

September 2020:  Dominic Calvert-Lewin

BBC Wales Sports Personality of the Year Award
1995:  Neville Southall

BBC Young Sports Personality of the Year Award
2003:  Wayne Rooney

U.S. Soccer Athlete of the Year
2008:  Tim Howard
2014:  Tim Howard

Icelandic Footballer of the Year
2017:  Gylfi Sigurðsson
2018:  Gylfi Sigurðsson
2019:  Gylfi Sigurðsson

Club records

Wins

Most League wins in a season – 29 in 42 matches, First Division, 1969–70
Fewest League wins in a season – 9 in 22 matches, First Division, 1912–13 and 9 in 42 matches, 1979–809 in 38 matches FA Premier League, 1997–98 and 2003–04

Defeats
Most League defeats in a season – 22 in 42 matches, FA Premier League, 1993–94
Fewest League defeats in a season – 1 in 22 matches, First Division, 1890–91

Goals
 Most League goals scored in a season – 121 in 42 matches, Second Division, 1930–31
 Fewest League goals scored in a season – 34 in 38 matches, Premier League, 2005–06
 Most League goals conceded in a season – 92 in 42 matches, First Division, 1929–30
 Fewest League goals conceded in a season – 27 in 40 matches, First Division, 1987–88

Points
 Most points in a League season (2 for a win) – 66 in 42 matches, First Division, 1969–70
 Most points in a League season (3 for a win) – 90 in 42 matches, First Division, 1984–85
 Fewest points in a League season (2 for a win) – 20 in 22 matches, First Division, 1888–89
 Fewest points in a League season (3 for a win) – 39 in 38 matches, Premier League, 2003–04 and 2021-22

Matches

Firsts

First FA Cup match – v. Bolton, First Qualifying Round, 12 November 1887 (drew 0–0)
First League match – v. Accrington, First Division, 8 September 1888 (won 2–1)
First match at Goodison – v. Bolton, First Division, (won 4–2)
First European match – v. Dunfermline F.C., Fairs Cup, 25 September 1962 (won 1–0)
First League Cup match  – v. Accrington Stanley, (won 3–1)

Record wins
Record League Victory: 9–1 v Manchester City, 3 September 1906; v Plymouth Argyle, 27 December 1930 (W Dean & J Stein both scored 4, a first for Everton)
Record FA Cup Victory: 11–2 v Derby County, FA Cup, 5th Round, 18 January 1890 (Hat-tricks from Fred Geary, Alec Brady and Alf Milward)
Record League Cup Victory: 8–0 v Wimbledon, League Cup, 2nd Round, 29 August 1978
Record Aggregate League Cup Victory: 11–0 v Wrexham, League Cup, 2nd Round, 1990
Record European Victory: 6–1 v SK Brann, UEFA CUP, Round of 32, 21 February 2008
Record Aggregate European Victory: 10–0 v Finn Harps, UEFA CUP, 1st Round, 1978
Record Friendly Victory: 0–22 v ATV Irdning, 14 July 2018

Record away wins
Record League Victory: 7–0 v Charlton Athletic, 7 February 1931
Record FA Cup Victory: 6–0 v Crystal Palace, 4 January 1931
Record Top Flight Victory: 6–1 v Derby County, 5 November 1892
Record League Cup Victory: 5–0 v Wrexham, League Cup, 2nd Round 1st Leg, 25 September 1990
Record European Victory: 5–0 v Finn Harps, UEFA Cup, 1st Round 1st Leg, 12 September 1978

Record defeats
Record League Defeat: 0–7 v Sunderland, Football League Div 1, 26 December 1934; v Wolves, Football League Div 1, 22 February 1939; v Arsenal, Premier League, 11 May 2005
Record FA Cup Defeat: 0–6 v Crystal Palace, FA Cup, 1st Round, 7 January 1922

Attendances
Highest League Attendance 78,299 v Liverpool, 18 September 1948
Highest FA Cup Attendance 77,902 v Manchester United, FA Cup, 5th Round, 14 February 1953
Highest League Cup Attendance 54,032 v Bolton, League Cup, Semi Final, 1st Leg, 18 January 1977
Highest European Attendance 62,408 v Internazionale Milano, European Cup, 1st Round, 1st Leg, 18 September 1963
Lowest League Attendance 7,802 v Sheffield Wednesday, 1 May 1934
Lowest FA Cup Attendance 15,293 v Wimbledon, FA Cup, 3rd Round Replay, 12 January 1993
Lowest League Cup Attendance 7,415 v Wrexham, League Cup, 2nd Round, 2nd Leg, 9 October 1990

National records
 Goodison Park was the world's first purpose made and designed dedicated football ground.
 Goodison Park is the only club ground to have hosted a world cup semi-final.
 Goodison Park was the venue for England v Republic of Ireland 21 September 1949. England lost 2–0 & this was their first home defeat to a non-UK country.  Everton's Peter Farrell scored.
 Everton were the first English club to appear in European competitions five seasons running (1962–63 to 1966–67).
 Everton have played in more top flight seasons than any other club.
 They have scored and conceded more goals in the top division than any other club.
 Everton have both drawn and lost more top flight matches than any other side.
 They hold the unusual distinction of being reigning League champions for the longest time. They won the championship in 1915 and thus remained reigning champions until the 1919–20 season due to the World War I league cancellation. They were also champions in 1939, and again remained reigning champions until the league resumed in 1946–47 after World War II.
 First club to be presented with the League Championship trophy and medals.
 First club to have the youngest Premiership goalscorer in two consecutive seasons with two different players
 First club to play 4000 top-flight games
 First club to amass 5000 League points
 First club to win the League Championship on two different grounds.
 First club to stage an FA Cup final
 First English club to install dugouts
 First English club to be invited to train at the Italian training HQ at Coverciano.
 First club to win the FA Cup Final after being 2–0 down.
 First club to appear in 4 consecutive Charity Shields at Wembley 1984–7.
 Jack Southworth's six goals v West Bromwich Albion, 30 December 1893, was the first such instance in Football League history.
 Most disciplinary points received in the Premier League (2 points for a red card, one for a yellow): 1252

Continental records
 First Club to be top of the iTunes chart, September 2020. Everton F.C. Spirit of the Blues.
 Goodison Park, built in 1892, was the world's first complete purpose-built football ground.
 Everton were the first club to install undersoil heating in their stadium.
 First club to win a penalty shoot-out in the European Cup – 1970 v Borussia Mönchengladbach
 First club to issue a regular match programme for home fixtures.
 First club to have a four-sided stadium with two tier stands
 First club to have a stadium with a three-tier stand

Penalty shoot-outs

See also
 Football records in England

References

This article uses material from the Wikipedia article Everton F.C. which is released under the Text of Creative Commons Attribution-ShareAlike 3.0 Unported License

External links
 Everton player statistics at Everton official site

Records And Statistics
Everton
Records